Ahmad Rashad Merritt (born February 5, 1977) is a former American football wide receiver. He was signed by the Chicago Bears as an undrafted free agent in 2000.  He played college football at Wisconsin.

Merritt was also a member of the Dallas Cowboys, Chicago Rush and Arizona Cardinals.

Early years
Merritt was born in Chicago and named after former NFL running back and wide receiver Ahmad Rashad, who was his father's favorite player at the time.  Merritt attended St. Rita High School on Chicago's south side, where, as a senior, he earned All-America honors from Prep Football Report and SuperPrep.  He had 63 receptions for 1,240 yards and 23 touchdowns throughout his high school career.  Merritt was a grade school, high school, and college teammate of former NFL player Tony Simmons.  Merritt and Simmons both played and caught touchdown passes in World Bowl IX.  In 2012, Merritt was inducted into the St. Rita High School Hall of Fame.

College career
Merritt started 21 games at wide receiver but primarily served as a return specialist through his four years at Wisconsin.  He finished his collegiate career with 36 receptions for 528 yards and two touchdowns, 28 kick returns for 521 yards and 25 punt returns for 165 yards.

Professional career

Chicago Bears
Merritt is probably most remembered for his 47-yard touchdown run on a reverse in the Bears 2001 divisional playoff loss to the Philadelphia Eagles (the last offensive touchdown scored for the Bears scored in Old Soldier Field).  He was also the leading receiver of the 2001 World Bowl Champion Berlin Thunder of NFL Europa.

Dallas Cowboys
Merritt was in training camp with the Dallas Cowboys in 2005 and was on the verge of securing a roster spot when he tore ligaments in his foot and was given an injury settlement.  He returned to the Cowboys in the offseason, but was later released a few days into training camp before the 2006 season.

Chicago Rush
Merritt started the first five games of the 2007 Arena Football season for the Chicago Rush, gaining 203 yards on 20 receptions with two touchdowns before being waived in early April.

Arizona Cardinals
Merritt was signed as a free agent by the Arizona Cardinals but spent his entire first season with the team on injured reserved after dislocating his ankle and breaking his fibula in a preseason game against the Houston Texans.  He was re-signed by the team on March 26, 2008; however, he was released prior to the season on August 20.

References

External links
Arizona Cardinals bio

1977 births
American football return specialists
American football wide receivers
Arizona Cardinals players
Berlin Thunder players
Chicago Bears players
Chicago Rush players
Dallas Cowboys players
Living people
Players of American football from Chicago
Wisconsin Badgers football players